The 1878 Canterbury by-election was fought on 2 March 1878.  The byelection was fought due to the resignation of the incumbent Conservative MP, Henry Munro-Butler-Johnstone.  It was won by the Conservative candidate Alfred Gathorne-Hardy, who was unopposed.

References

1878 in England
History of Canterbury
1878 elections in the United Kingdom
By-elections to the Parliament of the United Kingdom in Kent constituencies
19th century in Kent
Unopposed by-elections to the Parliament of the United Kingdom in English constituencies